Dendropsophus rubicundulus (common name: Lagoa Santa treefrog) is a species of frog in the family Hylidae.
It is found in Bolivia and Brazil. Earlier records from Paraguay are probably based on misidentified Dendropsophus jimi and Dendropsophus elianeae, but it is still likely to be also found in that country.

Dendropsophus rubicundulus is very common in Brazil but not elsewhere. It is found in the cerrado ecoregion and inhabits emergent or marginal herbaceous vegetation near ponds, pools, or lagoons in open areas. It is suffering from habitat loss.

References

rubicundulus
Amphibians of Bolivia
Amphibians of Brazil
Amphibians described in 1862
Taxa named by Christian Frederik Lütken
Taxa named by Johannes Theodor Reinhardt
Taxonomy articles created by Polbot